The S2 is a railway service of RER Vaud that provides hourly service between  and  in the Swiss canton of Vaud. Swiss Federal Railways, the national railway company of Switzerland, operates the service.

Operations 
The S3 and S4 also operate between Cossonay-Penthalaz and Cully, raising the service frequency to every 15 minutes.

History 

The "first" S2 was one of the six original lines of the RER Vaud, then called the Vaud Express Network (REV), when that system was established in December 2004.

The RER Vaud lines were substantially reorganized for the December 2022 timetable change. The S2 was shifted to the Jura Foot Line, replacing the S5 between Grandson and Lausanne. Where the S5 had operated to Aigle, with limited service further east, the new S2 terminated in Cully on weekdays and Lausanne at other times.

References

External links 
 2023 timetable: Grandson–Lausanne and Lausanne–Cully

RER Vaud lines
Transport in the canton of Vaud